The Orkhon River (Orkhon gol, Old Chinese: 安侯水 (*arhoushui)) is a river in Mongolia.

The Orkhon river derives its name from the Old Turkic prefix "or" meaning "middle", and "khan" or king.

It rises in the Khangai Mountains in the Tsenkher sum of Arkhangai aimag at the foot of the Suvraga Khairkhan mountain.
From there, it crosses the border into Övörkhangai aimag and follows the upper Orkhon valley in an eastern direction until it reaches Kharkhorin.

From Kharkhorin it flows northwards until it reaches Bulgan aimag, and then north-east to join the Selenge River next to Sükhbaatar city in Selenge aimag, close to the Russian border.
The Selenge then flows further north into Russia and Lake Baikal.

With , the Orkhon is longer than the Selenge, making it the longest river in Mongolia.  Major tributaries of the Orkhon river are the Tuul River and Tamir River.

There are two sets of ancient ruins along the river valley: Khar Balgas, the ancient capital of the Uyghur Kingdom and Karakorum,  the ancient capital of the Mongol Empire. Pyotr Kuzmich Kozlov excavated several Xiongnu Imperial tombs in the area of the river valley.

Fish in the Orkhon River include pike, carp, perch, taimen and catfish.

UNESCO lists the Orkhon Valley as a World Heritage Site.

See also 
 Khöshöö Tsaidam Monuments (World heritage site)
 List of rivers of Mongolia

References 
H. Barthel, Mongolei-Land zwischen Taiga und Wüste, Gotha 1990, p. 34f

External links 

Rivers of Mongolia